Tropical Storm Colin was a tropical cyclone that brought squally weather to Bermuda and caused extensive rip currents across the East Coast of the United States in August 2010. The fourth tropical cyclone and third named storm of the 2010 Atlantic hurricane season, Colin developed as a tropical depression from a low-pressure area in the central Atlantic on August 2. After forming, the storm initially strengthened gradually, attaining tropical storm status early on August 3. However, due to its acceleration to the west-northwest, Colin was unable to maintain a closed circulation and subsequently degenerated into a trough later that day. The National Hurricane Center noted the possibility of regeneration over subsequent days, and by August 5, Colin had once again become a tropical cyclone. However, vertical wind shear prevented further intensification and eventually weakened the storm. By early on August 8, Colin had weakened to a tropical depression, and dissipated near Bermuda shortly after. Though it remained well offshore, Colin produced rough seas along the East Coast of the United States. At least 205 ocean rescues were made. In Bermuda, effects were generally minimal.

Meteorological history

The origins of Tropical Storm Colin can be traced back to an elongated tropical wave that moved westward from Nigeria to Senegal on July 28. A nearly stationary trough separated from the wave as it continued westward. A larger tropical wave emerged off the west coast of Africa a few days later. Over the course of the next 24 hours, shower and thunderstorm activity became increasingly consolidated with the low, but the system lacked a well-defined circulation to be considered a tropical cyclone at the time. However, on the next day, an Advanced Scatterometer (ASCAT) pass revealed that the circulation center had become sufficiently defined, and the National Hurricane Center (NHC) initiated advisories on Tropical Depression Four at 1200 UTC on August 2. Further organization occurred as the depression moved around the southern periphery of a strong subtropical ridge.

Early on August 3, Colin's forward motion increased, and the cyclone was unable to maintain a closed circulation. The tropical storm degenerated into a trough at 1800 UTC, although tropical storm-force winds persisted. As the remnants passed north of the northern Leeward Islands, a reconnaissance aircraft investigated the system on August 4, but no closed circulation was found. As the remnants approached a weakness in the subtropical ridge across the western Atlantic on August 5, its forward speed gradually slowed as well.

Despite relatively unfavorable vertical wind shear impacting Colin, deep thunderstorm activity developed atop its center of circulation. A few computer models, namely the Geophysical Fluid Dynamics Laboratory (GFDL) and Hurricane Weather Research and Forecasting model (HWRF), predicted that Colin would briefly attain hurricane status.
 However, the surrounding moderate vertical wind shear prevented this. While turning towards the north on August 6, the cyclone entered an area increasingly unfavorable wind shear and cooler sea surface temperatures, subsequently prompting the NHC to downgrade Colin to a tropical depression by 0000 UTC on August 8.

Preparations and impact
Following Colin's regeneration into a tropical cyclone on August 5, the Government of Bermuda simultaneously issued a tropical storm warning for the island. Significant rainfall was also anticipated, with totals averaging . These values were later decreased after Colin weakened on August 6, with only a minimal storm surge forecast and rainfall roughly  less than previously stated. By August 7, all beaches were closed across the island due to rough seas and dangerous rip currents. The Royal Caribbean cruise ship, MS Explorer of the Seas, arrived in Bermuda that same day and was scheduled to set sail again on August 8; however, due to the threat of Colin, the vessel was forced leave later in the day instead of staying overnight. On August 8, the tropical storm warning in place for Bermuda was downgraded to a watch as Colin weakened to a tropical depression; it was discontinued hours later as the storm quickly dissipated.

Due to Colin's weakening to a tropical depression prior to its closest pass to Bermuda, its effects were significantly less than initially anticipated. Rainfall was limited to isolated showers and thunderstorms; the Bermuda International Airport measured  of rain in relation to Colin. Throughout the island, there were no reports of damage.

On August 7, a 51-year-old man drowned off the coast of Ocracoke, North Carolina after being caught in a rip current. Shortly after his death, officials issued rip current and undertow threats for the region. Between August 7 and 9, at least 205 ocean rescues were made along the North Carolina coastline due to rough seas produced by Colin.

See also

Other storms of the same name
Timeline of the 2010 Atlantic hurricane season

References

External links

 The NHC advisory archive on Tropical Storm Colin
 The NHC's graphics archive on Tropical Storm Colin

Colin (2010)
Colin
Colin